Candle holder or candleholder may refer to:

 Candlestick, a small device using a cup or spike to hold a candle in place
 Sconce (light fixture), a fixture attached to a wall that holds a candle or lamp
 Candelabra, a decoration holding candles on multiple arms
 Chandelier, a branched ornamental light fixture designed to be mounted on ceilings or walls
 Torchère, a lamp with a tall stand of wood or metal
 Julleuchter, a type of earthenware candle-holder originating in 16th-century Sweden, later redesigned and manufactured in Nazi Germany
 Ljuskrona, a Swedish term for chandelier
 Girandole, an ornamental branched candlestick or light fixture consisting of several lights, often resembling a small chandelier
 Candleholder liveforever, a species of succulent plant

See also 
 Candlestick (disambiguation)
 Triple candlestick (disambiguation)